The Henley College is a sixth form college in Henley-on-Thames, Oxfordshire, England. It was founded as a tertiary college in 1987 and changed its status to a sixth form college in 2010.

History and origins 
The college's roots date back to 1604, when the Free Grammar School of King James I was founded at the Chantry House in Henley. The charity school, which was more vocational than academic, was undowned by Dame Elizabeth Periam in 1609. The two schools were amalgamated in 1778.  The two colleges from which The Henley College was formed, King James's College and the South Oxfordshire Technical College, were controlled by Oxfordshire County Council. The merger of the two led in 1987 to a newly incorporated tertiary college responsible to the Further Education Funding Council (FEFC) for running its own affairs. In 2010 the college applied for sixth form college status, which was granted.

Current campus
The college offers a range of academic and vocational courses including more than 60 A-Levels, BTEC and other courses and also a number of vocational and part-time day and evening courses. Among the sports on offer are rugby union, football, basketball, netball and rowing. College rugby is linked with the London Wasps academy. A recently completed sports hall has been built at a cost of £2 million. Since its foundation the college has more than doubled in size and its catchment area has extended to cover a large part of the Thames Valley. The college was awarded Beacon status in 2010.

The college consists of two campuses, Deanfield and Rotherfield. A third campus, Southfield, was demolished in 1998 and the land sold to fund improvements to the rest of the site, notably a new building on the Deanfield campus.

Notable college alumni   
 David Arch, composer
 Richard Burns, 2001 World Rally Champion
 Bert Bushnell, gold medal rower, 1948 Summer Olympics
 Mark Burton, television and radio comedy writer
 Colonel Sir Arthur Davidson
 Adam Davy, actor
 Sally Dexter, actress
 Danny Goffey, drummer of Supergrass, son of Chris Goffey and brother of Nic Goffey
 Anastasia Hille, actress
 Simon Kernick, author
 Colin Smith, rower
 Marcus du Sautoy, Professor of Mathematics since 2002 and Charles Simonyi Professor of the Public Understanding of Science since 2008 at the University of Oxford, and who presented the BBC's The Story of Maths
 David Stoddart, Baron Stoddart of Swindon, Labour MP for Swindon from 1970–83
 Andrew Tristem, author and journalist
 Timothy Williamson, Wykeham Professor of Logic since 2000 at the University of Oxford, and President from 2004-5 of the Aristotelian Society, and from 2006-7 of The Mind Association
 Jo Wyatt, voice over actress and singer
John Horsley, photographer, most notably record cover art for The Verve and UB40

References

External links 
 College website

Henley-on-Thames
Education in Oxfordshire
Further education colleges in Oxfordshire
Learning and Skills Beacons
Educational institutions established in 1987
1987 establishments in England